Woodside, also known as the James Pinckney Henderson House, is a historic plantation house located near Lincolnton, Lincoln County, North Carolina.  It was built about 1798, and is a two-story, four bay by three bay, Federal style brick dwelling with a Quaker plan interior.  It has a gable roof, is set on a random granite foundation, and features three single-shouldered exterior end chimneys.  It was built by Lawson Henderson and is believed to be the birthplace of his son Texas political leader James Pinckney Henderson (1808–1858).

It was listed on the National Register of Historic Places in 1973.

References

Plantation houses in North Carolina
Houses on the National Register of Historic Places in North Carolina
Federal architecture in North Carolina
Houses completed in 1798
Houses in Lincoln County, North Carolina
National Register of Historic Places in Lincoln County, North Carolina